The historic and official language of Andorra is Catalan, a Romance language. Because of immigration, historical links, and close geographic proximity, Spanish and French are commonly spoken. There is a sizeable immigrant community that speaks Portuguese. Most Andorran residents can speak one or more of these, in addition to Catalan. Spanish is the most common mother tongue in Andorra according to mother tongue percentage statistics by the Andorran Government released in 2018.

Catalan 

Catalan is the only official language of Andorra. It is also the historical and traditional language of the country used by government, television, radio, and other national media and is the main language of all the people living in the territory of Andorran nationality, who constitute 33% of the total population.
The local dialect is Northwestern Catalan.

Recently the Government of Andorra is enforcing the learning and use of the language within the immigrant labor force as a means to fully apply the constitution and overcome the issue of people living in a country without knowing its only native language. Despite vast incoming tourism from Spanish-speakers from Spain, both public and private signage in Andorra is mostly monolingual in Catalan.

Andorra is the only country in which Catalan is the sole official language and the only country in which Catalan has official status in all of its territory.

Spanish and Galician 

Spanish is the most important language in Andorra after Catalan. It is the main language of about 70% of Spanish national immigrants (an additional 5% speak Galician). Most came to the country between 1955 and 1985.

Since then, Spanish has become the second most used language of the population living in the country, and moreover is the dominant language of communication amongst people of different linguistic backgrounds, thus triggering recent government efforts to promote more general and universal use of Catalan.

Portuguese

French 

The nearby border with France, the reduced tax-free cost of living, and job opportunities in the thriving tourist industry have resulted in 7% of the country's total population being French nationals, mainly immigrants from Francophone Africa. It is the main language of communication next to Catalan in Pas de la Casa on the French border.

As with Spanish, children can be taught at school in the French language, if parents so choose.

References

External links
 Ethnologue report for Andorra
 CIA – The World Factbook
 Departament d'Estadistica
 Tractaments protocul-laris